St. Petersburg, Florida, held an election for mayor on February 27 and March 27, 2001. A non-partisan primary election was first held on February 27. No candidate won a majority of the vote, so the top two finisher advanced to a runoff.

Results

Primary

Runoff

References

2001
Mayoral election, 2001
St. Petersburg mayor
St. Petersburg